was a women's football club. Its hometown was the city of Hiroshima.

Squad

Current squad
As of 02 April 2022.

Results

References

External links
 Angeviolet Hiroshima official site
 Japanese Club Teams

Women's football clubs in Japan
Association football clubs established in 1991
1991 establishments in Japan
Sports teams in Hiroshima